Dropephylla is a genus of rove beetles.

References 

 A revision of the Palaearctic species of the genus Dropephylla (Coleoptera: Staphylinidae: Omaliinae). T Jászay, P Hlavác - Entomological Problems, 2006
 Clarifications of and corrections to A revision of the Palaearctic species of the genus Dropephylla (Coleoptera: Staphylinidae: Omaliinae). MK Thayer, T Jaszay, P Hlavác, Entomological Problems, 2007

Staphylinidae genera
Omaliinae